George Croft may refer to:

George W. Croft (1846–1904), American congressman for South Carolina (1903–1904)
George Croft (priest) (1747–1809), English Anglican and Bampton Lecturer